Pomacea eximia is a South American species of freshwater snail with gills and an operculum, an aquatic gastropod mollusc in the family Ampullariidae, the apple snails.

Distribution
P. eximia is endemic to Venezuela.

References

eximia
Molluscs of Venezuela
Gastropods described in 1853